The 2009 Global Champions Tour was the 4th edition of the Global Champions Tour (GCT), an important international show jumping competition series. The series is held mainly in Europe, one competition and also the final are held outside of Europe. All competitions are endowed at least 285000 euros. All GCT events were held as CSI 5*.

The competitions was held between May 2, 2009 and August 23, 2009. The final was held in Doha, Qatar from  November 11, 2009 to November 15, 2009.

The champion of the Global Champions Tour Final of this year is Michel Robert of France on Kellemoi de Pepita.

Competitions 

All competitions are held as competition over two rounds against the clock with one jump-off against the clock.

The placement of the riders, who are not qualified for the jump-off, results of the number of penalties of both rounds and the time of the second round. The placement of the riders, who are not qualified for the second round, results of the number of penalties and the time of the first round. Competitors who are not qualified for the second round, placed behind the riders who compete in the second round.

1st Competition: Global Champions Tour of Italy 
April 2, 2009 to April 5, 2009 - Arezzo, 
Competition: Saturday, April 4, 2009 - Start: 5:30 pm, prize money: 285000 €

(Top 3 of 49 Competitors)

2nd Competition: Global Champions Tour of Spain 
May 8, 2009 to May 10, 2009 - Museo de las Ciencias Príncipe Felipe, Ciutat de les Arts i les Ciències, Valencia, 
Competition: Saturday, May 9, 2009 - Start: 4:00 pm, prize money: 285000 €

(Top 3 of 50 Competitors)

3rd Competition: Global Champions Tour of Germany 
May 21, 2009 to May 24, 2009 - Hamburg (German show jumping and dressage derby), 
Competition: Saturday, May 23, 2009 - Start: 1:30 pm, prize money: 285000 €

(Top 3 of 48 Competitors)

4th Competition: Global Champions Tour of France 
June 11, 2009 to June 13, 2009 - Cannes, 
Competition: Saturday, June 13, 2009 - Start: 6:00 pm, prize money: 285000 €

(Top 3 of 44 Competitors)

5th Competition: Global Champions Tour of Monaco 
June 25, 2009 to June 27, 2009 - shore at the marina „Port Hercule“, Monte Carlo, 
Competition: Saturday, June 27, 2009 - Start: 6:00 pm, prize money: 285000 €

(Top 3 of 45 Competitors)

6th Competition: Global Champions Tour of Portugal 
July 9, 2009 to July 11, 2009 - Hipódromo Manuel Possolo, Cascais near Estoril, 
Competition: Saturday, July 11, 2009 - Start: 7:00 pm, prize money: 400000 € (show jumping grand prix with the highest prize money in Europe)

(Top 3 of 45 Competitors)

7th Competition: Global Champions Tour of Brasil 
July 31, 2009 - August 2, 2009 - equestrian facility of the Sociedade Hípica Brasileira, Rio de Janeiro (Athina Onassis International Horse Show), 
Competition: Saturday, August 1, 2009 - Start: 1:45 pm, prize money: 285000 €

(Top 3 of 42 Competitors)

8th Competition: Global Champions Tour of the Netherlands 
August 20, 2009 - August 23, 2009 - Valkenswaard, 
Competition: Saturday, August 22, 2009 - Start: 1:45 pm, prize money: 285000 €

(Top 3 of 50 Competitors)

Global Champions Tour Final

overall standings (after 8 competitions)  

(Top 5), 6 results count for the final standing

Final 
November 11, 2009 to November 14, 2009 - Doha,

First round 
Competition: Thursday, November 12, 2009 - Start: 9:00 pm, prize money: 50000 €

(Top 3 of 25 Competitors)

Final result after second round and jump-off 
Competition: Saturday, November 14, 2009 - Start: 8:00 pm, prize money: 900000 €

(Top 5 of 18 Competitors)

References 

Global Champions Tour
Global Champions Tour